Jecheon International Music & Film Festival (제천국제음악영화제, JIMFF) strives to be both a celebration of film set in Jecheon City and music for all generations and musical tastes. Jecheon is located in Chungcheongbuk province in central South Korea.

The 13th edition of JIMFF was held from 10 to 15 August 2017. 

"World Music Film Today", JIMFF's sole competition section, will present films from around the world. The jury members will award two outstanding films with the Grand Prize and Special Jury Prize among the most contemporary selections related to music regardless of genre.

Other sections will introduce the various aspects of music cinema and a number of musical performances staged outdoors on the shores of Cheongpung Lake. The Jecheon Film Music Award honors film musicians who have had significant influence on Korean film and music culture and the Jecheon Film Music Academy is a program designed for specialized education about film music.

The 17th edition of The Jecheon International Music and Film was held from 12 to 17 August 2021. In this edition 116 films from 25 countries were screened. Due to COVID-19 pandemic surge it was organised offline as well as online. The World Music Film Flow (International Competition) Best Picture Award was given to A Thousand Rockers, One Band by Anita Rivaroli. The 18th edition of The Jecheon International Music and Film was held from 11 to 16 August 2022.

Film program 
World Music Film Today: The official competition at JIMFF for the feature-length film (More than 60mins without genre limits)
Cine Symphony : A series of narrative films and musical films that focus on music; This program addresses various musical ways throughout acclaimed new music themed dramatic films all around the world
Music in Sight : Documentary films that focus on any genre of music and musicians’ life
Korean Music Film Now: The Korean latest music films in the various genres including narrative, documentaries and animated films 
Family Fest: Featuring popular films that appeal to the broad generations
Theme and Variations: Various films under a specific theme
Cinema Concert: The film screening that is accompanied by a musical soundtrack played by a musician in sync at the stage

Music program
One Summer Night
Uirim Summer Night

Special program
Jecheon Music Academy
JIMFF Forum

History

See also

List of music festivals in South Korea 
List of film festivals in South Korea

References

External links
 Official website
 

Music festivals established in 2004
Film festivals in South Korea
Jecheon
Music festivals in South Korea
Annual events in South Korea
Summer events in South Korea